This is a list of museums in Sicily, Italy.

References 

Sicily